Haliotis madaka is a species of sea snail, a marine gastropod mollusk in the family Haliotidae, the abalones.

Description
The size of the shell varies between 60 mm and 246 mm.

Distribution
This marine species occurs off Japan and Korea.

References

 Geiger D.L. & Owen B. (2012) Abalone: Worldwide Haliotidae. Hackenheim: Conchbooks. viii + 361 pp. page(s): 100 [details]
 Geiger D.L. & Poppe G.T. (2000). A Conchological Iconography: The family Haliotidae. Conchbooks, Hackenheim Germany. 135pp 83pls

External links
 

madaka
Gastropods described in 1877